17th Online Film Critics Society Awards
December 16, 2013

Best Picture: 
12 Years a Slave
The 17th Online Film Critics Society Awards, honoring the best in film for 2013, were announced on 16 December 2013.

Winners and nominees

Best Picture
12 Years a Slave
American Hustle
Before Midnight
Blue Is the Warmest Colour
Drug War
Gravity
Her
Inside Llewyn Davis
Short Term 12
The Wind Rises

Best Director
Alfonso Cuarón – Gravity
Joel and Ethan Coen – Inside Llewyn Davis
Spike Jonze – Her
Steve McQueen – 12 Years a Slave
Hayao Miyazaki – The Wind Rises

Best Actor
Chiwetel Ejiofor – 12 Years a Slave
Tom Hanks – Captain Phillips
Oscar Isaac – Inside Llewyn Davis
Mads Mikkelsen – The Hunt
Joaquin Phoenix – Her

Best Actress
Cate Blanchett – Blue Jasmine
Amy Adams – American Hustle
Julie Delpy – Before Midnight
Adèle Exarchopoulos – Blue Is the Warmest Colour
Brie Larson – Short Term 12

Best Supporting Actor
Michael Fassbender – 12 Years a Slave
Barkhad Abdi – Captain Phillips
Jared Leto – Dallas Buyers Club
Matthew McConaughey – Mud
Sam Rockwell – The Way, Way Back

Best Supporting Actress
Lupita Nyong'o – 12 Years a Slave
Sally Hawkins – Blue Jasmine
Scarlett Johansson – Her
Jennifer Lawrence – American Hustle
Léa Seydoux – Blue Is the Warmest Colour

Best Original Screenplay
Her – Spike JonzeAmerican Hustle – Eric Warren Singer and David O. Russell
Blue Jasmine – Woody Allen
Inside Llewyn Davis – Joel and Ethan Coen
Museum Hours – Jem Cohen

Best Adapted Screenplay12 Years a Slave – John RidleyBefore Midnight – Julie Delpy, Ethan Hawke, and Richard Linklater
In the House – François Ozon
Short Term 12 – Destin Daniel Cretton
The Wind Rises – Hayao Miyazaki

Best Foreign Language FilmBlue Is the Warmest Colour
Drug War
Museum Hours
Wadjda
The Wind Rises

Best Documentary
The Act of Killing
56 Up
At Berkeley
Blackfish
Stories We Tell

Best Animated Feature
The Wind Rises
Despicable Me 2
From Up on Poppy Hill
Frozen
Monsters University

Best Cinematography
Gravity – Emmanuel Lubezki
12 Years a Slave – Sean Bobbitt
The Grandmaster – Philippe Le Sourd
The Great Beauty – Luca Bigazzi
Inside Llewyn Davis – Bruno Delbonnel

Best Editing
Gravity – Alfonso Cuarón and Mark Sanger
12 Years a Slave – Joe Walker
Drug War – Allen Leung
Her – Eric Zumbrunnen and Jeff Buchanan
Inside Llewyn Davis – Roderick Jaynes

References 

2013 film awards
2013